The Odessa Grand Prix is a road cycling race held annually since 2015. In 2015 the race consisted of two one day races, but in 2016 it was a single race. It is part of UCI Europe Tour in category 1.2.

Winners

Odessa Grand Prix

References

UCI Europe Tour races
Recurring sporting events established in 2015
2015 establishments in Ukraine
Cycle races in Ukraine
Sport in Odesa
Summer events in Ukraine